Gibbon is an English and Irish surname with Norman roots.

The surname is derived from "Gibb", a short form of the popular Norman personal name Gilbert, which was first introduced in the 11th century by followers of William the Conqueror after the Norman Conquest of England. It was originally derived from the name Gislebert or Gillebert, which is composed of the Germanic elements Gisil which means "hostage", "pledge", or "noble youth," and berht, which means "bright" or "famous."

Notable people 
Dafydd Gibbon (born 1944), British linguist
Edward Gibbon (1737–1794), English historian, writer, and politician
Gary Gibbon (born 1965), English journalist
Jill Gibbon, British artist
John Gibbon (1827–1896), American army officer
John Heysham Gibbon (1903–1973), American surgeon
Joe Gibbon (1935–2019), American baseball player
Lardner A. Gibbon (1820–1910), US Navy lieutenant, Amazon explorer, co-author of Exploration of the Valley of the Amazon
Ray Gibbon (c. 1926–1999), Canadian politician
Roger Gibbon (born 1944), Trinbagonian track cyclist
William Monk Gibbon (1896–1987), Irish poet and author

See also
Gibbons, a surname
Lewis Grassic Gibbon (1901–1935), pen name of Scottish writer James Leslie Mitchell
Fitzgibbon, an Irish surname derived from Gibbon.

References

English-language surnames